Vinzant Software is a privately held company that is based in Hobart, IN. Vinzant Software develops and markets enterprise job scheduling products for platforms including Windows, Unix, Linux, IBM i and MPE/ix.  It was founded in 1988 by David Vinzant and has solely focused on job scheduling since 1995.

History 
Vinzant, Inc. was started in 1987 by Dave Vinzant. Initially, it developed add-on programs to a property management software package called SKYLINE, which Vinzant had been involved in developing.

As client–server computing was first getting started in 1988, Vinzant, Inc. worked with Microsoft and Novell. Vinzant developed SQLFile, the first shipping front end for the Ashton-Tate/Microsoft SQL Server in 1989. SQLFile was expanded to include support for DOS, OS/2 and Windows. It was a flexible development tool that created screens and reports that accessed data stored in Microsoft SQL Server, NetWare SQL and Oracle Server.

In 1990, Novell announced the NetWare Loadable Module(NLM) version of NetWare SQL and the SQLFile System for DOS was shipped to thousands of users worldwide as part of Novell's 'Client Server Starter Kit'. Vinzant, Inc. was selected by Oracle to develop the installation program for the Oracle Server for NetWare. Other SQL-based products developed by Vinzant, Inc. include the SQL BASIC Library which allowed compiled BASIC to be used with Microsoft SQL Server and the SQL Server Connectivity Pack which allowed SQL Server to be run on Novell networks.

Later, Vinzant shifted its focus to the emerging job scheduling and batch processing market. ECS was developed to provide a central point of control for a network of DOS, OS/2, and Windows-based PCs, as well as other features.

In 1999, ECS was redesigned to provide support for Unix and Linux systems. The result was the Global Event Control Server (Global ECS or GECS)due to its IP-based architecture and ability to control computers and processes worldwide.

Global ECS
Global ECS is the main product offering from Vinzant Software. It is an event-driven enterprise level job scheduling product. It supports native Agents for other platforms including Unix, Linux, IBM i and MPE/ix that can all be managed from a single point using either a Windows or browser-based client. In addition to traditional time-based job scheduling, it supports triggers such as the existence of a file or completion of another job(s) or batch. Global ECS includes user-definable recovery actions that allow for built in job logic to allow the production flow to self-correct. It also includes flexible exception management that allows for multiple methods of notification.

Implementations
Job scheduling and batch processing are tools to help manage data processing systems by automating operations, improving quality, reducing costs, and improving resource utilization. Typical uses are scheduling file transfers, database updates, report generation, compilations and backups. Global ECS is used by businesses whose core product is their information or data, such as financial institutions (banking, insurance, securities, brokerage, retirement and credit cards), government agencies, and information resources. Other industries to use Global ECS are energy, health care, retail and manufacturing.

Industry Affiliations 
 Apple Developer Connection
 HP Developer and Solution Partner Program
 IBM DeveloperWorks
 Intel Software Partner Program
 Microsoft Developer Network
 Novell Developer Network
 Red Hat Developer Program
 SCO Developer Network
 SGI Global Developer Program
 Sun Developer Network

See also
Information Management
Business Process Automation
Job Scheduling

External links
 Vinzantsoftware.com official company site.
 Processor Magazine Job Scheduler Matrix.

References 

Job scheduling